Sarah Ann Godlewski (born November 9, 1981) is an American businesswoman and politician serving as the 31st secretary of state of Wisconsin since March 2023. She was previously the 36th state treasurer of Wisconsin (2019–2023).

Godlewski was a candidate in the Democratic primary for the 2022 United States Senate election in Wisconsin before dropping out of the race in July 2022.

Early life and education
Godlewski was born in Eau Claire, Wisconsin, and graduated from Memorial High School in 2000. She completed a Bachelor of Arts degree in peace and conflict resolution from George Mason University. She also completed a certificate in public treasury management from the National Institute of Public Finance and Pepperdine School of Management, was a national security fellow at the Air War College, and attended the University of Virginia Sorensen Institute for Political Leadership as well as the Executive Master of Public Administration program at the University of Pennsylvania.

Career 
Godlewski has worked in philanthropy. Projects included education reform and public health in Uganda. Between 2004 and 2012, Godlewski worked for defense contractor Booz Allen Hamilton.

Godlewski worked for Arapahoe County, Colorado, from 2012 to 2016 as the director of the Office of Strategy and Performance. During that time, Godlewski was a member of the Joint Task Force on Veterans with PTSD which made recommendations to the Department of Veterans Affairs and the United States Congress.

In 2015, Godlewski co-founded investment firm MaSa Impact with her husband Max Duckworth. They first met in 2013 on a regional volunteer board of the U.S. Fund for UNICEF.

In 2016, Godlewski was the director of Women's Outreach for Wisconsin in Hillary Clinton's presidential campaign. Godlewski caucused for Clinton in Colorado in March 2016. She did not vote in the general election in Wisconsin, because she was unsure of whether she qualified as a resident, according to a spokesperson. 

Godlewski served on the board for the U.S. Fund for UNICEF and served as chairperson of the UNICEF Advocacy Committee. Godlewski served on the board for mOm Incubators, the Arlington Academy of Hope, and George Mason University's School of Visual and Performance Arts. Godlewski has also been an investor with WE Capital.

Wisconsin State Treasurer

Campaign 
In February 2018, Godlewski led a campaign coalition opposing a ballot measure that would have eliminated the office of the State Treasurer. Voters rejected the measure, voting to retain the state treasurers office by a 62 to 38 percent margin. In April 2018, Godlewski announced her candidacy for state treasurer. Godlewski won a three-way primary on August 14, 2018, receiving 43.5% of the vote. Her opponents were former television anchor Cynthia Kaump and former Treasurer Dawn Marie Sass.

Godlewski raised over $700,000 for her campaign, while Travis Hartwig, her Republican opponent, raised less than $13,000. Godlewski and her husband contributed over $300,000 to her own campaign. She won the general election with 50.9% of the vote, to Hartwig's 46.8%. She took more of the vote share than the newly elected Democratic governor, lieutenant governor, and attorney general and flipped 9 counties that went for Trump.

Tenure 
After being elected, Godlewski received a memo from the Legislative Reference Bureau that identified 16 responsibilities that the State Treasurer should be doing but had neglected in recent years. During the transition for Governor-elect Tony Evers, Godlewski was appointed to serve as a member of the Next Generation Workforce and Economic Development Policy Advisory Council. In January 2019, Godlewski was unanimously elected to serve as chairwoman of the state Board of Commissioners of Public Lands. The state Board of Commissioners of Public Lands voted to lift a GOP mandated gag order prohibiting staff from discussing or considering the material risk of climate change to state investments. In August 2019, Godlewski and Governor Evers established a Retirement Task Force to create new investment options and expand awareness of retirement planning in Wisconsin. In February 2021, the Task Force presented its results to Governor Evers. Its recommendations include five proposals: WisconsinSaves, 401(K)ids, Emergency Savings, Incentivize Participation, Interactive E-Commerce Portal. In March 2020, Godlewski created the Treasurer's Homeowners Task Force. In her role as the chair of the Board of Commissioners of Public Lands, she released an additional $5.25 million to aid in virtual learning on top of a record $38.2 million to public school libraries.

2022 U.S. Senate election 

On April 14, 2021, Godlewski announced her campaign for the United States Senate to represent Wisconsin in the 2022 election. She was endorsed by EMILY's List, a Democratic political action committee (PAC) that seeks to elect pro-choice women.

Godlewski's investments in 14 pharmaceutical companies drew scrutiny from a reporter at the Milwaukee Journal Sentinel due to her attacks on big pharma in advertisements for her Senate run. Godlewski's campaign responded that the stocks had all been sold by early 2022 and she had not been involved in routine investment management.

Godlewski dropped out of the race in July 2022 prior to the August 2022 Democratic primary and endorsed Lieutenant Governor Mandela Barnes.

Wisconsin Secretary of State 
In a surprise announcement on March 17, 2023, Governor Tony Evers announced that the recently re-elected secretary of state, Doug La Follette, would retire after forty years in office, and Evers was immediately appointing Godlewski to serve out the term expiring in January 2027.

References

External links

Government website
Campaign website

|-

|-

1981 births
21st-century American businesspeople
21st-century American businesswomen
21st-century American politicians
21st-century American women politicians
American investors
Businesspeople from Wisconsin
Candidates in the 2022 United States Senate elections
George Mason University alumni
Hillary Clinton 2016 presidential campaign
Living people
People associated with the 2016 United States presidential election
Politicians from Eau Claire, Wisconsin
Politicians from Madison, Wisconsin
Secretaries of State of Wisconsin
State treasurers of Wisconsin
Wisconsin Democrats
Women in Wisconsin politics